Josef Fojtík (born September 11, 1984) is a Czech former professional ice hockey left winger.

Fojtík played four games in the Czech Extraliga, two for HC Zlín and two for HC Oceláři Třinec, during the 2005–06 season. He also played in the American Hockey League for the Grand Rapids Griffins, the Tipsport Liga for HK Nitra and HK Dukla Trenčín and in the Polska Hokej Liga for KS Cracovia.

References

External links

1984 births
Living people
Allen Americans players
MKS Cracovia (ice hockey) players
Czech ice hockey left wingers
Danville Wings (USHL) players
HK Dukla Trenčín players
Flint Generals (IHL) players
Grand Rapids Griffins players
HC Havířov players
SHK Hodonín players
LHK Jestřábi Prostějov players
HC Kometa Brno players
HK Nitra players
HC Oceláři Třinec players
People from Kopřivnice
HC RT Torax Poruba players
HC ZUBR Přerov players
Stadion Hradec Králové players
Victoriaville Tigres players
PSG Berani Zlín players
Sportspeople from the Moravian-Silesian Region
Czech expatriate ice hockey players in Canada
Czech expatriate ice hockey players in Slovakia
Czech expatriate ice hockey players in the United States
Czech expatriate sportspeople in Austria
Czech expatriate sportspeople in Italy
Czech expatriate sportspeople in Poland
Expatriate ice hockey players in Austria
Expatriate ice hockey players in Italy
Expatriate ice hockey players in Poland